Petrolia High School is a public high school located in the community of Petrolia, Texas (USA) and classified as a 2A school by the UIL. It is part of the Petrolia Independent School District located in west central Clay County. The school serves Petrolia, Dean, and Byers.

History
A consolidation vote with neighboring Byers Independent School District was held in 2012 due to dwindling enrollment at Byers School. Students from Byers began attending Petrolia in the fall of 2012.  In 2015, the school was rated "Met Standard" by the Texas Education Agency.

Athletics
The Petrolia Pirates compete in the following sports:

Baseball
Basketball
Cross Country
Football
Golf
Powerlifting
Softball
Tennis
Track and Field
Volleyball

State titles
Football 
2002(1A)

References

External links
Petrolia ISD

Schools in Clay County, Texas
Public high schools in Texas
Public middle schools in Texas
Public elementary schools in Texas